Schilling Lake is a lake in Sibley County, in the U.S. state of Minnesota.

Schilling Lake was named for John Schilling, a pioneer settler.

References

Lakes of Minnesota
Lakes of Sibley County, Minnesota